Bhit Shah railway station 
(Sindhi: ڀٽ شاھ ريلوي اسٽيشن) is a railway station located in the town of Bhit Shah, Sindh, Pakistan.

See also
 List of railway stations in Pakistan
 Pakistan Railways

References

External links

Railway stations in Matiari District